Jeffrey Warren Daniels (born February 19, 1955) is an American actor, musician and playwright, known for his work on stage and screen playing diverse characters switching between comedy and drama. He is the recipient of several accolades, including two Primetime Emmy Awards, in addition to nominations for three Tony Awards, five Screen Actors Guild Awards, and five Golden Globe Awards.

He made his film debut in Miloš Forman's drama Ragtime (1981) followed by James L. Brooks' Terms of Endearment (1983), and Mike Nichols' Heartburn (1986). He then received two Golden Globe Award nominations for Woody Allen's The Purple Rose of Cairo (1985) and Jonathan Demme's Something Wild (1986). The following decade he starred in Gettysburg (1993), action film Speed (1994), the comedy Dumb and Dumber (1994), the family film 101 Dalmatians (1996), and fantasy film Pleasantville (1998). During the 2000s, Daniels starred in critically acclaimed films such as Stephen Daldry's psychological drama The Hours (2002), Noah Baumbach's coming of age comedy The Squid and the Whale (2005), George Clooney's historical drama Good Night, and Good Luck (2005), and the Truman Capote drama Infamous (2006). He also appeared in the science fiction action film Looper (2012), Danny Boyle's drama Steve Jobs (2015), and Ridley Scott's science fiction film The Martian (2015).

From 2012 to 2014, Daniels starred as Will McAvoy in the HBO political drama series The Newsroom, for which he won the 2013 Primetime Emmy Award for Outstanding Lead Actor in a Drama Series and received Golden Globe and Screen Actors Guild Award nominations. He won a second Primetime Emmy Award in 2018 for his performance in the Netflix miniseries Godless (2017). That same year he was nominated for portraying John P. O'Neill in the Hulu miniseries The Looming Tower (2018). In 2020 he played FBI director James Comey in The Comey Rule for Showtime.

Daniels has also received several award nominations for his work on stage, including Tony Award nominations for Best Actor for his roles in the plays Yasmina Reza's God of Carnage, David Harrower's Blackbird, and Aaron Sorkin's To Kill a Mockingbird. He is the founder and current executive director of the Chelsea, Michigan Purple Rose Theatre Company.

Early life
Daniels was born in Athens, Georgia, to Marjorie J. (née Ferguson) and Robert Lee "Bob" Daniels (1929–2012). He spent the first 6 weeks of his life in Georgia, where his father was then teaching, before moving back to his parents' native Michigan, where he grew up in Chelsea. His father owned the Chelsea Lumber Company and was a one-time mayor of the town.

Daniels was raised Methodist. He briefly attended Central Michigan University and participated in the school's theater program. In the summer of 1976, he attended the Eastern Michigan University drama school to participate in a special Bicentennial Repertory program, where he performed in The Hot l Baltimore and three other plays performed in repertoire. Marshall W. Mason was the guest director at EMU, and he invited Daniels to come to New York to work at the Circle Repertory Theatre, where he performed in Fifth of July by Lanford Wilson in the 1977–78 season. Daniels performed in New York in The Shortchanged Review (1979) at Second Stage Theatre. It was the first show of the inaugural season for Second Stage Theatre.

Career

1980s 
During the mid-1970s through to the early 1990s, Daniels starred in several New York productions, on and off Broadway. On Broadway, he has appeared in Lanford Wilson's Fifth of July (1980) alongside William Hurt, for which Daniels was nominated for a Drama Desk Award for Best Supporting Actor. He also starred in A. R. Gurney's The Golden Age (1984) with Stockard Channing.

Daniels made his screen debut in Miloš Forman's Ragtime in 1981. His next film was in James L. Brooks’s Terms of Endearment, which won the Academy Award for Best Picture. The film follows an emotional relationship between mother (Shirley MacLaine) and daughter (Debra Winger). Daniels plays Winger's callow and unfaithful husband, a role which would prove to be his breakthrough.

In 1985, Daniels starred in Woody Allen’s The Purple Rose Of Cairo alongside Mia Farrow and Danny Aiello. The film was met with critical praise earning a 91% on Rotten Tomatoes with the consensus reading, "lighthearted and sweet, Purple Rose stands as one of Woody Allen's more inventive – and enchantingly whimsical – pictures." Daniels garnered a Golden Globe nomination for his performance It was the film that inspired the name for the theater company he established.

In 1986, he starred in Jonathan Demme's Something Wild as an unassuming businessman swept up into a wild night by a mysterious woman (Melanie Griffith) and earned his second Golden Globe nomination.

1990s
During the 1990s, Daniels continued his work in the theater with Redwood Curtain (1993), Off-Broadway, he starred in Lanford Wilson's Lemon Sky with Cynthia Nixon where he received a Drama Desk nomination for and an Obie Award for his performance in the Circle Repertory Company production of Johnny Got His Gun. Daniels appeared in an Off-Broadway production of David Harrower's Blackbird alongside Allison Pill, with whom he would later reunite in Aaron Sorkin's The Newsroom.

In 1991 Daniels founded the Purple Rose Theatre Company, a nonprofit stage company in Chelsea, Michigan, named after the 1985 Woody Allen movie, The Purple Rose of Cairo, which Daniels starred in. Daniels has written more than a dozen plays for the company.

In 1990, Daniels starred in two films (Love Hurts and The Butcher's Wife). His next significant role was as Colonel Joshua Chamberlain in Gettysburg. Daniels reprised the role of Chamberlain 10 years later in the prequel film Gods and Generals.

In 1994 Daniels would co-star with Jim Carrey in one of his most commercially successful films, Dumb and Dumber. It was a noted departure for Daniels, owing to his status as a dramatic actor. That same year Daniels appeared with Keanu Reeves in the action blockbuster Speed; the film was an enormous hit, grossing over $350 million at the box office.

Daniels would then host Saturday Night Live a second time before the release of the 1996 Disney live-action remake of 101 Dalmatians. Daniels plays a grungy cop Alvin Strayer along with Eric Stoltz in 2 Days in the Valley.   Daniels starred as the owner of a litter of dalmatians stolen by the evil Cruella De Vil (Glenn Close). The film was successful, grossing $320 million. Also in 1996 was the family hit film Fly Away Home with Daniels as the supportive single father of Anna Paquin's goose-raising preteen. Daniels then had a critical and commercial misfire with Trial and Error (1997). He would rebound, however, with 1998's Pleasantville as diner owner Bill Johnson, who learns to act as an individual and rebel against the norm at the urging of Tobey Maguire's David. Also starring Reese Witherspoon, Joan Allen, and Don Knotts, Pleasantville was nominated for three Academy Awards. Daniels starred alongside Christopher Lloyd in the critically and commercially unsuccessful film, My Favorite Martian.

2000s
Daniels starred in the TV films The Crossing, Cheaters, and the direct-to-video release Chasing Sleep. At this point, in the early 2000s, he began to focus more on his theater work at The Purple Rose Theatre as well as writing, starring, and directing the films Escanaba in da Moonlight and Super Sucker.

Daniels's next major film role would be in Clint Eastwood's Blood Work, which received mixed reviews and was a commercial failure. He would rebound later that year with Stephen Daldry's Academy Award-winning The Hours alongside Meryl Streep, Julianne Moore, and Nicole Kidman. The film was also a financial success, grossing well over $100 million. Gods and Generals followed in 2003, as did the action film I Witness, which co-starred James Spader. Daniels then starred in Imaginary Heroes and the 2004 television film adaptation of fellow Michigander and friend Mitch Albom's bestseller The Five People You Meet in Heaven.

The year 2005 proved to be a strong year for Daniels as he garnered notice as the star of the lauded Noah Baumbach film The Squid and the Whale with Laura Linney. Daniels received his third Golden Globe nomination for the film, about a divorcing couple and the effect the split has on their children. That year Daniels also starred in the family film adaptation of Because of Winn-Dixie. He would round out the year with a supporting role in George Clooney's Oscar-nominated film Good Night and Good Luck, starring David Straithairn, Patricia Clarkson, Robert Downey Jr., and Frank Langella.

In 2006, Daniels appeared in the Truman Capote biopic Infamous starring Toby Jones, Sandra Bullock, Gwyneth Paltrow, and Sigourney Weaver. The film was compared by critics to Bennett Miller's 2005 film Capote starring Philip Seymour Hoffman, Catherine Keener, and Chris Cooper.

Daniels then starred in Barry Sonnenfeld's family film RV, alongside Robin Williams, as the redneck comic foil to Williams' uptight businessman. He also starred in two other independent films, Mama's Boy and The Lookout, for which he was nominated for a Satellite Award.

He then took back-to-back supporting roles in political thrillers: Traitor with Don Cheadle and State of Play with Russell Crowe and Rachel McAdams. Also in 2009, Daniels appeared in the indie hit Away We Go.

In 2009, after a 16-year-long absence, Daniels returned to Broadway in Yasmina Reza's original play God of Carnage alongside Hope Davis, James Gandolfini, and Marcia Gay Harden. The play centers around two sets of parents who agree to meet because of a fight among their respective sons. Their meeting starts out civilized, however, as the evening goes on, the parents become increasingly childish, resulting in the evening's devolving into chaos. The play debuted at The Bernard B. Jacobs Theatre in previews on February 28, 2009, and officially on March 22, 2009. Originally planned for a limited engagement to close July 19, 2009, the run was extended through February 28, 2010, before converting to an open-ended run. Daniels received his first Tony Award Nomination for Tony Award for Best Actor in a Play for his performance. The show won the Tony Award for Best Play.

2010s

In 2010, Daniels continued his theater work and had a starring role in the little-seen indie Howl, alongside James Franco as Allen Ginsberg.

Daniels was featured on the cover of the April–May 2011 issue of Guitar Aficionado magazine as well as the July–August 2011 issue of Making Music, where he discussed his experiences with music. In 2012 Daniels became the new announcing voice for Apple with the iPhone 5 ads.

Daniels had a career resurgence with his turn in Aaron Sorkin's HBO drama series The Newsroom (2012–2014) as fictional news anchor Will McAvoy. The opening scene of the pilot episode "We Just Decided To", in which Daniels gives a monologue on the state of American greatness, has been viewed more than 13 million times. While the show received mixed reviews, Daniels won the Primetime Emmy Award for Lead Actor in a Drama Series for the first season. The series ran for two more seasons, for which Daniels was nominated for the Primetime Emmy Award. The show also starred Emily Mortimer, John Gallagher Jr., Sam Waterston, Olivia Munn, Alison Pill, Dev Patel, and Jane Fonda.

In 2015, Daniels reunited with Sorkin in the biographical drama film Steve Jobs with Michael Fassbender, and Kate Winslet. He portrayed CEO John Sculley. Daniels starred alongside Michael Fassbender, and Kate Winslet, both of whom received Academy Award nominations for their performances. The film was directed by Academy Award-winner Danny Boyle and written by Academy Award winner Aaron Sorkin. The film was a critical success earning an 86% on Rotten Tomatoes with the consensus reading, "Like the tech giant co-founded by its subject, Steve Jobs gathers brilliant people to deliver a product whose elegance belies the intricate complexities at its core." Sorkin won the Golden Globe for its screenplay.

He played David in The Divergent Series: Allegiant and was set to reprise the role in the planned The Divergent Series: Ascendant. In 2014 he reprised his role as Harry Dunne in Dumb and Dumber To reuniting with Jim Carrey.

In 2016, Daniels returned to Broadway in the Revival of David Harrower's Blackbird alongside Michelle Williams. The play depicts a young woman (Williams) meeting a middle-aged man (Daniels), 15 years after being sexually abused by him when she was twelve. The play ran at the Belasco Theatre on February 5, 2016 (37 previews), and opened officially on March 10 (through June 11, 108 performances) where it was directed by Joe Mantello and received widespread critical acclaim. Daniels was nominated for his second Tony Award for Best Actor in a Play. Williams received a Tony Award nomination as well.

In 2017, Daniels starred in Netflix's western miniseries Godless where he portrayed the villain Frank Griffin. He starred alongside Michelle Dockery, Merritt Wever, and Sam Waterston. Daniels won critical praise for his performance and was nominated for the Primetime Emmy Award for Supporting Actor in a Miniseries, which he won.

In 2018, Daniels's Hulu's miniseries The Looming Tower traces the rising threat of Osama bin Laden and Al-Qaeda in the late 1990s and how the rivalry between the FBI and CIA during that time may have inadvertently set the path for the tragedy of 9/11. Daniels played John O'Neill, the chief of the New York FBI's Counter-terrorism Center. The ensemble included Bill Camp, Michael Stuhlbarg, and Peter Sarsgaard. Daniels won widespread critical acclaim and received a Primetime Emmy Award nomination for Best Actor in a Limited Series.

In 2018, Daniels starred as Atticus Finch, reuniting with Aaron Sorkin in his stage adaptation of To Kill a Mockingbird. The play opened on Broadway at the Shubert Theatre. The production began previews on November 1, 2018, prior to its official opening on December 13, 2018. During the week ending on December 23, 2018, the production grossed over $1.5 million, breaking the record for box office grosses for a non-musical play in a theater owned by The Shubert Organization. Daniels received his third Tony Award nomination for Best Actor in a Play. The show received 8 other Tony Award nominations. In June 2019, producer Scott Rudin announced that Daniels would leave the production in November 2019 and would be succeeded by Ed Harris. Daniels' last performance was on November 3, 2019.

2020s
Daniels narrated the History Channel miniseries on George Washington titled Washington (2020). The 3 part documentary series premiered on February 16, 2020.

On September 27, 2020, Daniels portrayed FBI director James Comey in the 2 part limited series, The Comey Rule which debuted on Showtime. The project is based on Comey's memoir, A Higher Loyalty (2018), and was written and directed by Billy Ray. The cast included Brendan Gleeson as Donald Trump, Jennifer Ehle as Patrice Comey, Holly Hunter as Sally Yates, and Michael Kelly as Andrew McCabe. Daniels won critical praise for his performance as Comey and received a Golden Globe Award nomination.

In 2019, it was announced that Showtime has given a straight-to-series order to American Rust, a drama based on Philipp Meyer’s debut novel of the same name. Daniels is set to executive produce the project and star alongside Maura Tierney and Bill Camp.

In June 2021, it was announced that Daniels would be returning to his role of Atticus Finch in the Broadway production of To Kill a Mockingbird starting in October.

Daniels narrated the 9/11 documentary from Apple TV+ entitled 9/11: Inside the President's War Room which was released on September 1, 2021.

Activism

Purple Rose Theatre Company

The Purple Rose Theatre Company (or PRTC) was founded by Daniels in 1991. Originally known as the Garage Theatre, The Rose takes its name from Woody Allen's 1985 film The Purple Rose of Cairo, which starred Daniels and Mia Farrow. The theatre provides resources for training actors, playwrights, and other theatre artists residing in the Midwest and develops new plays based on life in the Great Lakes Basin. The main performance space and administrative offices occupy a building in Chelsea, Michigan, once owned by Daniels' grandfather. The theatre produces four shows a year on a 3/4 thrust stage in a 168-seat house. The PRTC is a 501(c)3 not-for-profit organization and operates under a Small Professional Theatre (SPT) Agreement with the Actors' Equity Association (AEA). The Purple Rose offers a year-long apprenticeship program for young artists entering a career in theatre. Apprentices are paid a modest stipend and work as many as 80 hours per week gaining experience in lighting, sound, stage management, design, set construction, and administrative/box office work. The seven apprentices also maintain and clean the theatre's facilities. The program was inspired by Daniels' experience as an apprentice with the Circle Repertory Company in New York City.

Personal life
In 1986, he moved back to his hometown of Chelsea, Michigan, and as of 2016 he still primarily resides there. In 1979, Daniels married his college sweetheart, a fellow Michigan resident also from Chelsea, Kathleen Rosemary Treado. The couple have three children: Benjamin (born 1984), Lucas (born 1987), and Nellie (born 1990).

Daniels has appeared as the TV spokesman for the Michigan Economic Development Corporation, promoting Michigan's effectiveness in bringing in new companies, featured on CNBC. He was inducted into the Michigan Walk of Fame on May 25, 2006, in Lansing, Michigan, and delivered the winter commencement address at the University of Michigan on December 20, 2009, at which he was granted an Honorary Doctorate in Fine Arts.

In 2020, Daniels endorsed Joe Biden in the presidential election against Donald Trump. He narrated a campaign ad for Biden titled "America Needs Michigan", focusing on the swing state of Michigan. In the ad Daniels states, "Michigan deserves a president who believes in things like decency, honesty and respect", adding that he voted for Biden.

In 2022, a nematode parasite that kills tarantulas was named Tarantobelus jeffdanielsi to honour his role in Arachnophobia.

Filmography

Film

Television

Theatre

Discography 
Daniels has written and recorded six full-length albums with proceeds benefitting The Purple Rose Theater.

Jeff Daniels Live and Unplugged
Jeff Daniels Live at The Purple Rose Theater
Grandfather's Hat
Keep It Right Here
Together Again
Days Like These.

Awards and nominations

References

External links

 
 
 
 

1955 births
20th-century American male actors
21st-century American male actors
20th-century American dramatists and playwrights
American male film actors
American male stage actors
American male television actors
American male voice actors
American United Methodists
Central Michigan University alumni
Living people
Male actors from Michigan
Michigan Democrats
Musicians from Athens, Georgia
Obie Award recipients
Outstanding Performance by a Lead Actor in a Drama Series Primetime Emmy Award winners
Outstanding Performance by a Supporting Actor in a Miniseries or Movie Primetime Emmy Award winners
People from Chelsea, Michigan
People from Athens, Georgia